In mathematics and theoretical computer science, a pattern is an unavoidable pattern if it is unavoidable on any finite alphabet.

Definitions

Pattern 
Like a word, a pattern (also called term) is a sequence of symbols over some alphabet.

The minimum multiplicity of the pattern  is  where  is the number of occurrence of symbol  in pattern .

Instance 
Non-erasing means that  for all , where  denotes the empty string.

Avoidance / Matching 
Otherwise,  is said to avoid , or to be -free. This definition can be generalized to the case of an infinite , based on a generalized definition of "substring".

Avoidability / Unavoidability on a specific alphabet 
A pattern  is unavoidable on a finite alphabet  if each sufficiently long word  must match ; formally: if .

By Kőnig's lemma, pattern  is avoidable on  if and only if there exists an infinite word  that avoids .

Maximal  -free word 
Given a pattern  and an alphabet . A -free word  is a maximal -free word over  if  and  match  .

Avoidable / Unavoidable pattern 
A pattern  is an unavoidable pattern (also called blocking term) if  is unavoidable on any finite alphabet.

If a pattern is unavoidable and not limited to a specific alphabet, then it is unavoidable for any finite alphabet by default. Conversely, if a pattern is said to be avoidable and not limited to a specific alphabet, then it is avoidable on some finite alphabet by default.

-avoidable / -unavoidable 
A pattern  is -avoidable if  is avoidable on an alphabet  of size . Otherwise,  is -unavoidable, which means  is unavoidable on every alphabet of size .

If pattern  is -avoidable, then  is -avoidable for all .

Avoidability index 
The avoidability index of a pattern  is the smallest  such that  is -avoidable, and  if  is unavoidable.

Properties 

A pattern  is avoidable if  is an instance of an avoidable pattern .
Let avoidable pattern  be a factor of pattern , then  is also avoidable.
A pattern  is unavoidable if and only if  is a factor of some unavoidable pattern .
Given an unavoidable pattern , then the reversal  is unavoidable.
Let  represent the number of distinct symbols of pattern . If , then  is avoidable.

Zimin words 

Unavoidability 
All Zimin words are unavoidable.

A word  is unavoidable if and only if it is a factor of a Zimin word.

Given a finite alphabet , let  represent the smallest  such that  matches  for all . We have following properties:

 is the longest unavoidable pattern constructed by alphabet  since .

Pattern reduction

Free letter 
Given a pattern  over some alphabet , we say  is free for  if there exist subsets  of  such that the following hold:

For example, let , then  is free for  since there exist  satisfying the conditions above.

Reduce 

Locked 
A word  is said to be locked if  has no free letter; hence  can not be reduced.

Transitivity 

Unavoidability 

Graph pattern avoidance

Avoidance / Matching on a specific graph 
Given a simple graph , a edge coloring  matches pattern  if there exists a simple path  in  such that the sequence  matches . Otherwise,  is said to avoid  or be -free.

Similarly, a vertex coloring  matches pattern  if there exists a simple path  in  such that the sequence  matches .

Pattern chromatic number 
The pattern chromatic number  is the minimal number of distinct colors needed for a -free vertex coloring  over the graph .

Avoidability / Unavoidability on graphs 

 Avoidance on words can be expressed as a specific case of avoidance on graphs; hence a pattern  is avoidable on any finite alphabet if and only if  for all , where  is a graph of  vertices concatenated.

Probabilistic bound on  

If , then  is avoidable on graphs.

Explicit colorings 
Given a pattern  such that  is even for all , then  for all , where  is the complete graph of  vertices.

Then .

Given a pattern  such that , and a tree  with degree .

Examples 

A square-free word is one avoiding the pattern . The word over the alphabet  obtained by taking the first difference of the Thue–Morse sequence is an example of an infinite square-free word.
All binary patterns can be divided into three categories:
 are unavoidable.
 have avoidability index of 3.
others have avoidability index of 2.
 has avoidability index of 4, as well as other locked words.
 has avoidability index of 5.
The repetitive threshold  is the infimum of exponents  such that  is avoidable on an alphabet of size . Also see Dejean's theorem.

Open problems 

Given an arbitrarily pattern , is there an algorithm to determine the avoidability index of ?

References

 
 
 
 

Semigroup theory
Formal languages
Combinatorics on words